Sergey Artemyevich Balasanian (13 August 1902 in Ashgabat, Russian Empire13 June 1982 Moscow, Russia) was a Soviet and Armenian composer. He taught composition in the Moscow Conservatory. Balasanian wrote the first Tajik opera – The Uprising at Vosse (first staged in 1939). It was debuted in Moscow in 1941 as part of a 10-day exhibition of Tajik art. 

Sergey Balasanian was awarded the Stalin Prize (1949) and five orders. In 1957 he was decorated as People's Artist of the Tajik SSR, and in 1963 as Honored Art Worker of the Russian SFSR.

Works 
 Sakuntala (ballet)
 The Uprising at Vosse (opera,1939)
 Blacksmith Kova (opera, 1941)
 Song of Anger (musical drama, 1942)
 Armenian Rhapsody (orchestral suite, 1944)
 Leyli and Majnun (ballet, 1947)
 Bakhtior and Nisso (opera, 1954)
 Afghan Pictures (symphonic cycle, 1959)
 Four Folk Songs of Africa (song cycle, 1961)
 Cello Sonata (1976)
 Across Armenia (1978)

References 

1902 births
1982 deaths
People from Ashgabat
People from Transcaspian Oblast
Turkmenistan people of Armenian descent
Soviet Armenians
Communist Party of the Soviet Union members
Armenian composers
Russian male classical composers
Soviet composers
Soviet male composers
Turkmenistan composers
20th-century classical composers
20th-century Russian male musicians
Moscow Conservatory alumni
Academic staff of Moscow Conservatory
People's Artists of the RSFSR
Stalin Prize winners
Recipients of the Order of the Red Banner of Labour